Gnomidolon bordoni is a species of beetle in the family Cerambycidae. It was described by Joly in 1991.

References

Gnomidolon
Beetles described in 1991